Re-Kill is 2015 American horror film directed by Valeri Milev and written by Michael Hurst. It stars Scott Adkins, Bruce Payne, and Daniella Alonso as members of paramilitary group tasked with hunting down and destroying zombies after an outbreak.

Plot
A young girl returns home to find her parents missing and the house in disarray.  She sits down to watch television, and the news reveals that five years earlier, a zombie outbreak killed off 4.5 billion people worldwide, 10 million of which are from the United States.  After detonating a nuclear bomb over San Francisco and walling off New York City, the U.S. government declared the outbreak over and established a paramilitary force known as R-Division to hunt down and destroy the remaining zombies.  The girl watches a reality TV series called Re-Kill that broadcasts live footage of R-Division squads.  Commercials interrupt the show, showing attempts to repopulate the United States and reassure the populace.

The show begins with a recap.  An embedded journalist accompanies a squad on a raid to New Orleans, which has had reports of zombie activity.  The squad is overrun, and only two people make it to a car: Alex Winston and the journalist.  When the journalist stops speaking coherently and moans uncontrollably, Winston realizes she is infected and shoots her.  The government promises that the situation is under control and clears out the zombies.  Winston is reassigned to Division 6, which includes new recruit Tom Falkirk, former thief Omar Hernandez, immigrant Nguyen, Rose Matthews, "Grizzly" Adams, conspiracy theorist Trent Parker, and the squad leader, Sarge.

Along with embedded journalists Jimmy and Bobby, Division 8 is sent to investigate reports of a family who are harboring reanimated members.  Sarge explains that the outbreak spread so far because people could not give up hope their loved ones could be saved.  After neutralizing the human resistance, the soldiers rescue prisoners kept chained up for zombie food.  One of the family members reveals that his sister, a zombie, is kept in the attic.  Before she can be put down, she bites Tom, who is mercy-killed to prevent him from turning into a zombie.  In interviews, Parker is dismissive of Tom's sacrifice, and Sarge says that it is a known risk of the job.

Division 8's next job is to investigate a truck suspected of carrying contraband.  When they finally stop the truck, they find it contains zombies.  Sarge uses a rocket-propelled grenade to clear out the zombies.  The truckers initially profess ignorance of their cargo but eventually confirm rumors of the Judas Project, a shadowy program rumored to be an experiment on the zombies trapped in New York City.  Parker believes it to be a secret military project, but Sarge is more concerned with the possibility of a second outbreak, which he believes is inevitable due to human nature.

In the forbidden areas of New York City known as The Zone, they discover dead scientists and zombies who seem more intelligent.  After an ambush, Omar insists that Parker was bit and demands they kill him.  Before they kill him, Parker opens fire on the squad, killing Adams.  Winston is wounded next, and he sacrifices himself with a grenade to allow the others to escape.  In a previously recorded interview, he describes his belief that the government has secretly organized an ark for eligible survivors; he posthumously wishes the squad well and hopes they are accepted there.  Deeper in the Zone, Hernandez is bitten and turns.

As the squad faces a horde of zombies, including Hernandez, a man who claims to be the last remaining member of the Judas Project leads them to safety but Nguyen falls behind and is killed.  He explains the project was designed to turn the zombies against each other, but it instead revealed an alpha zombie, nicknamed Elvis, capable of leading a zombie army.  Jimmy says the network's drones will pick up and broadcast his and Bobby's footage every two hours.  As they perform reconnaissance, Bobby dies, alerting the zombie army.  The squad flees, but Sarge and the Scientist are killed by the horde. Elvis appears and kills Jimmy and throws Rose a window. He tries strangling her to death but she kills him and escapes The Zone. As a special news report reveals zombie activity near the Zone and the start of a new outbreak, the young girl who was watching the program is revealed to have transformed into a zombie.  Elsewhere, it is shown that the ark is real and soldiers, including Rose, discuss having found groups of survivors.

Cast
 Scott Adkins as Trent Parker
 Daniella Alonso as Rose Matthews
 Bruce Payne as Alex Winston
 Roger Cross as Sarge
 Jesse Garcia as Omar Hernandez
 Rocky Marshall as Langford
 Layke Anderson as Tom Falkirk
 Raicho Vasilev as Elvis
 Dimiter Doichinov as "Grizzly" Adams
 Yo Santhaveesuk as Nguyen
 Randall Kamm as male anchor
 Cat Tomeny as news anchor

Production
The film is part of the eight film series After Dark Films Originals. The After Dark Horrorfest 8 Films to Die For  brand and After Dark Films produced in cooperation with Lionsgate and NBC Universal's Syfy. Principal photography began in July 2010 in Sofia, Bulgaria, and was directed by Bulgarian filmmaker Valeri Milev.

Release
It was released by Lionsgate in the US on 16 October 2015 and is part of the After Dark Originals Film Festival.

Reception
Pat Torfe of Bloody Disgusting rated it 3/5 stars and wrote that although the film's premise of a zombie-hunting reality TV show is new, the components of the film have been done before.  Torfe said the commercials enhance the verisimilitude but break the flow of the film.  Ari Drew of Dread Central rated it 2/5 stars and wrote that the film should have focused more on the tone used in the satirical commercials rather than repetitive and clichéd scenes of zombie fighting.  Mark L. Miller of Ain't It Cool News wrote, "While there are some decent scenes of gore and zombie terror, it just seems so unoriginal and tired."

References

External links
 
 
 

2015 films
2015 horror films
American zombie films
American independent films
Films shot in Bulgaria
Films set in New York City
Films set in New Orleans
2010s English-language films
2010s American films